Live at XM is an EP by Wheatus released on 15 December 2004 and exclusively available at Apple's iTunes Store. It features five songs from a live performance that was part of an hour-long Wheatus special, broadcast by XM Satellite Radio. The song 'Lemonade' on the EP was dedicated to Brendan B. Brown's neighbors.

Track listing
 "The Deck" (Live) – 4:31
 "Anyway" (Live) – 5:33
 "Hey, Mr. Brown" (Live) – 3:09
 "Teenage Dirtbag" (Live) – 6:01
 "Lemonade" (Live) – 4:26

External links
 Live at XM at the iTunes Store

Wheatus albums
2004 EPs
2004 live albums
Live EPs